Albin Moller was a German author, astrologer, and translator who lived in eastern Germany during the late 16th and early 17th centuries.

Life and career

Moller was born in Straupitz, and worked there as a pastor. He died in Altdöbern.

Astrological works

In 1596, Moller published Die grosse: Practica Astrologica, a guide to astrology. In 1602, he published Fleissig und Getrewlich Gestellet, an astrological calendar, in Leipzig. The title page features a woodcut of Moller at age sixty. He published another calendar, Alt und New Schreibcalender Auff das Jar nach unsers Herrn Jhesu Christi Geburt MDCI, around 1600.

Other works

Moller translated the Lutheran hymn book Hymnal and catechism into the Sorbian language in 1574, the first book to be printed in the language. He published Die Pflanzen der Arzneikräuter-Liste von (List of Medicinal Plants and Herbs) in 1582.

References

16th-century births
17th-century deaths
German astrologers
16th-century astrologers
17th-century astrologers
German translators
German male non-fiction writers
17th-century German male writers